The men's 60 kg weightlifting competitions at the 1976 Summer Olympics in Montreal took place on 20 July at the St. Michel Arena. It was the thirteenth appearance of the featherweight class.

Results

References

Weightlifting at the 1976 Summer Olympics